A dastarkhwān (Perso-Arabic alphabet: دسترخوان) or dastarkhān is the name used across Central Asia, South Asia and the Caribbean to refer to the traditional space where food is eaten. The term may refer to the tablecloth which is spread on the ground, floor, or table and is used as a sanitary surface for food, but it is also used more broadly to refer to the entire meal setting. The Mughal Indian cookbook Dastarkhwan-e-Awadh, which details the Awadhi cuisine of Lucknow, emphasized the importance of the dastarkhwan.

Dastarkhwan is a Turkic word meaning "tablecloth". It is used in many other languages of the South-Central Asian region such as Balochi, Bengali, Urdu, Sindhi, Hindi, Kyrgyz, Kazakh, Uzbek, Turkmen, Dari, Pashto and Nepali.

See also
Central Asian cuisine
South Asian cuisine
Caribbean cuisine

References

Indian cuisine 
Pakistani cuisine
Bangladeshi cuisine
Nepalese cuisine
Tajik cuisine
Afghan cuisine
Kazakhstani cuisine
Kyrgyz cuisine
Turkmenistan cuisine
Uzbekistani cuisine
Indo-Caribbean cuisine
Serving and dining